Senator Pullen may refer to:

Albert J. Pullen (1861–1937), Wisconsin State Senate
Kent Pullen (1942–2003), Washington State Senate